Steven Seigo (born August 1, 1990) is a Canadian professional ice hockey defenceman. He is currently a free agent.

Playing career 
Seigo attended the Michigan Technological University where he played four seasons (2009 – 2013) of NCAA Division I hockey with the Michigan Tech Huskies, scoring 19 goals and 56 assists for 75 points, and earning 85 penalty minutes in 150 games played.

On March 22, 2013, the Abbotsford Heat of the American Hockey League (AHL) signed Seigo to an amateur try-out agreement, allowing Seigo to skate in nine games with the Heat towards the end of the 2012–13 AHL season.

On July 8, 2013, HC TPS of the SM-liiga signed Seigo for the 2013–14 season. He then had his contract renewed for the 2014-15 campaign. Following his two-year stint in Finland, he joined Dinamo Riga of the Kontinental Hockey League (KHL) for the 2015–16 season.

In May 2016, he penned a deal with Lukko of the Finnish SM-liiga. Seigo added to his journeyman status playing the following 2017–18 season with Swedish club, Mora IK, of the Swedish Hockey League.

As a free agent, Seigo belatedly signed a one-year agreement with German club, the Straubing Tigers of the Deutsche Eishockey Liga, leading into the 2018–19 season, on September 4, 2018. As a staple on the blueline, Seigo added 5 goals and 18 points in 51 games before being unable to help the Tigers progress pass the Wild Card round to the playoffs. He left the Tigers as a free agent at the conclusion of his contract.

On March 28, 2019, Seigo opted return to Finland and continue his career in the Liiga, signing a one-year deal with Vaasan Sport.

Career statistics

Awards and honours

References

External links

1990 births
Living people
Canadian ice hockey defencemen
Ice hockey people from Saskatchewan
Bonnyville Pontiacs players
Michigan Tech Huskies men's ice hockey players
Abbotsford Heat players
HC TPS players
Dinamo Riga players
Lukko players
Mora IK players
Straubing Tigers players
Vaasan Sport players
ERC Ingolstadt players
HK Poprad players
Canadian expatriate ice hockey players in the United States
Canadian expatriate ice hockey players in Latvia
Canadian expatriate ice hockey players in Finland
Canadian expatriate ice hockey players in Slovakia
Canadian expatriate ice hockey players in Sweden
Canadian expatriate ice hockey players in Germany